Gary Simpson (born 10 June 1959, in Chesterfield) is an English former footballer who played as a forward. He played in The Football League for Chesterfield and Chester City.

Playing career
Simpson began his playing career with hometown club Chesterfield, where he progressed through the youth ranks to make more than 40 league appearances. In the summer of 1981 he joined fellow Third Division side Chester for £6,000. This came after Chester had been unsuccessful in attempting to sign Simpson's Chesterfield colleague Ernie Moss to strengthen their squad of just 14 professional players. Simpson marked his competitive debut with a goal in a Football League Trophy tie against Bury and he ended the season as the club's top scorer with 12 league goals to his name as they finished bottom of the table. His tally included two goals on his return to Chesterfield, as Chester registered a shock 5–3 win in monsoon conditions.

The following season saw him score six times in the league before being one of eight players released at the end of the season. He joined Oswestry Town but then played for Bangor City in the Alliance Premier League later in the 1983–84 season.

Bibliography

References

1959 births
Living people
Footballers from Chesterfield
English footballers
English Football League players
National League (English football) players
Association football forwards
Chesterfield F.C. players
Chester City F.C. players
Oswestry Town F.C. players
Bangor City F.C. players